Member of the Provincial Legislature (MPL) is a title given to the members of eight of the nine provincial legislatures in South Africa. The Western Cape provincial constitution specifies that its provincial legislature be given the title of "Provincial Parliament", while its members hold the title of "Member of Provincial Parliament (MPP)".

According to the national Constitution of South Africa, the minimum size of a provincial legislature is 30 members and the maximum size is 80 members. These members are elected by party-list proportional representation with a closed list, using the largest remainder method with the Droop quota to allocate any surplus. Members are elected to a five-year term with no term-limits. The most recent election occurred in 2019.

Composition of Provincial Legislatures
This list shows nine provincial legislatures and their party composition after the elections of 2019.

References

Provincial legislatures of South Africa
Legislatures
Legislature